J. Narasimha Swamy is an Indian politician. He was elected to the Karnataka Legislative Assembly from Doddaballapura in the 2008 Karnataka Legislative Assembly election as a member of the Indian National Congress, later as a member of Bharatiya Janata Party. He is the son of Former Textile Minister R. L. Jalappa.

References

External links
 J Narasimhaswamy Doddaballapur

Living people
Karnataka MLAs 2008–2013
Year of birth missing (living people)
Bharatiya Janata Party politicians from Karnataka
Indian National Congress politicians
Karnataka MLAs 2004–2007
Indian National Congress politicians from Karnataka